Founded in 2007, the Caucasus Nature Fund (CNF), is a German non-profit organization that supports the protected areas in the South Caucasus countries of Armenia, Azerbaijan and Georgia. The fund's mission is to provide long-term funding for operating costs, improved management and sustainable development of the region's protected areas. The trust works through public-private partnerships with the three governments by matching, but not exceeding the State budgets. This ensures each side is committing long-term support for the protected areas.

Headquartered in Frankfurt/Main, Germany, with program offices in Tbilisi, Georgia and Yerevan, Armenia, the trust supports 18 protected areas across the three countries.

Caucasus Biodiversity Hotspot 

The Caucasus Ecoregion is one of the most biologically rich regions on Earth. Home to an unusually high number of endemic plant and animal species, it ranks as one of  the world's biodiversity “hotspots" according to both Conservation International and WWF.

Formed by the isthmus between the Black and Caspian Seas, the Caucasus ecoregion is a biological crossroads, where plant and animal species from Europe, Central Asia, the Middle East, and North Africa mingle with endemic species found nowhere else on earth. About the size of France, the hotspot spans 500,000 square kilometers including Armenia, Azerbaijan and Georgia, as well as small portions of Russia, Iran and Turkey. Amazingly, this relatively small area holds 9 climate zones from semi-desert to high altitude tundra, from alpine meadow to deep forest. Here you can find over 6,400 plant species, 348 birds, 131 mammals, 86 reptiles, 17 amphibians and 127 freshwater fishes.

Funding activities 
In 2022, CNF awarded four subdivisions of Armenia's Ministry of the Environment €335,000 to cover expenses. €142,500 was allocated to the Zangezur Biosphere Complex, €80,000 to Khosrov Forest State Reserve, €82,500 to Dilijan National Park, and €30,000 to Lake Arpi National Park.

Notable Board Members 

A notable advisory board member is Gabriela Von Habsburg, the granddaughter of Charles I, last emperor of Austria.

References

External links
Caucasus Nature Fund, official Webpage
CNF Facebook Page, official Facebook Page
Conservation Finance Alliance charter, financials and other documents

Caucasus
Environmental organisations based in Germany
Wildlife conservation organizations